Bradley Woods is an area of woodland in Wiltshire, south of Longleat Woods and north of Gare Hill.

A 48.7 hectare area within the site has been notified as a biological Site of Special Scientific Interest, notification originally taking place in 1986.

Sources
 Natural England citation sheet for the site (accessed 22 March 2022)

External links
 Natural England website (SSSI information)

Sites of Special Scientific Interest in Wiltshire
Sites of Special Scientific Interest notified in 1986